Magnolia sororum is a species of flowering plant in the family Magnoliaceae. It is commonly known as vaco. It is native to the mountain forests of Costa Rica and western Panama, and may range into Nicaragua.

Description
Magnolia sororum is a large tree, growing up to 40 meters tall.

Range and habitat
Magnolia sororum is native to the mountains of Costa Rica and western Panama, including the Cordillera Central and Cordillera de Talamanca. The species' estimated extent of occurrence (EOO) is around 20,000 km2. A population was reported in  Bosawas Biosphere Reserve in northern Nicaragua. If confirmed, this population would extend the species' EOO to around 60,000 km2.

It is found in mature humid upper montane forests from 2,300 to 3,200 meters elevation. In Panama its range extends into lower montane forests.

Subspecies
There are two accepted subspecies:
 Magnolia sororum subsp. lutea Vazquez – Costa Rica
 Magnolia sororum subsp. sororum – Honduras, Southeastern Mexico, Nicaragua, Panama

Uses
Its wood is used for fuelwood, charcoal, timber, and handicrafts.

References

sororum
Flora of Costa Rica
Flora of Panama
Flora of the Talamancan montane forests
Plants described in 1938